Qinglong Manchu Autonomous County (Mölendroff: cinglung manju beye dasangga siyan) is a Manchu autonomous county in northeastern Hebei province, China, bordering Liaoning Province to the north and east and located in the eastern part of the Yan Mountains. Bordering county-level divisions are: Lingyuan and Jianchang County (Liaoning) to the north, Liaoning's Suizhong County and Qinhuangdao city proper to the east, Qian'an and Lulong County to the south, and Kuancheng Manchu Autonomous County and Qianxi County to the west.

During the 1976 Tangshan earthquake 180,000 buildings in Qinglong collapsed, but no fatalities occurred.

Administrative divisions
Qinglong administers 11 towns and 14 townships, which in turn control 396 villages:

Climate
Qinglong has a monsoon-influenced, humid continental climate (Köppen Dwa), with long, cold, and very dry winters, and hot, rainy summers. Spring and autumn are short with some rainfall.

See Also
Zushan Mountain:Mountain in the Qinglong region

References

Manchu autonomous counties
County-level divisions of Hebei
Qinhuangdao